Craig of the Creek is an American animated television series created by Matt Burnett and Ben Levin for Cartoon Network. The show's pilot episode debuted directly on the official app on December 1, 2017. The series premiered online on February 19, 2018, with a double-premiere event airing on March 30, 2018. 

On February 17, 2021, the series was renewed for a fourth season which premiered on October 25, 2021. On January 19, 2022, the series was renewed for a fifth season, set to premiere in early 2023. Additionally, a spin-off for Cartoonito, Jessica's Big Little World,  and an origin film titled Craig of the Creek: The Movie, are currently in production.

In October 2022, it was announced that the fifth season of the series would be cut in half by Warner Bros. Discovery. In December 2022, it was announced the show's final episode had been written, and that seven episodes were cut from the fifth season.

The series has received positive reviews from critics. Its friendship, diversity and LGBT themes have attracted a broad fanbase.

Synopsis
In the fictional suburban Baltimore/DC area town of Herkleton, Maryland, a boy named Craig Williams and his two friends, Kelsey Pokoly and J.P." Mercer, have their many adventures in the titular creek, described as a kid utopia of untamed wilderness in which tribes of children reign over tree forts and dirt bike ramps.

Characters

Main
 Craig Williams (voiced by Philip Solomon) – A 10-year-old boy who enjoys playing at the creek with his friends, Kelsey and J.P. He is a natural leader and always tries to help other kids when they need it the most. He has a colorful family that has been the focus of several episodes (such as King of Camping).  Craig typically carries a homemade staff and a purse, each holding sentimental value. In "Escape From Family Dinner", it is shown that Craig takes advanced math and admits that he likes the class. He also takes on the role of a cartographer as he is constantly making additions to his detailed map of the Creek.
 Kelsey Pokoly (voiced by Georgie Kidder (pilot, season 1, episodes 1–3), Noël Wells (season 1, episode 4–present)) – A ginger-haired, 9-year-old girl who is one of Craig's close friends. She is always seen wearing a purple cape and has a pet budgerigar (which she identifies as a falcon) named Mortimor who is usually perched on top of her head. She typically carries a homemade PVC pipe sword which she proudly made herself partly with the help of a blacksmith. She and her family are implied to be Hungarian in "The Invitation" and "The Last Kid in the Creek" due to her knowledge of Hungarian cuisine; Pokoly, her family name, is likely derived from the Hungarian word "pokoli", meaning "hellish". She is adventurous, loves books, and tends to be overly dramatic. She often internally narrates her life, for which others are completely aware. She is raised by her single widower father. In "Doorway to Helen", it is revealed that Kelsey is Jewish, and in "Fire and Ice" it is revealed that she is a lesbian.
 J.P. Mercer (voiced by H. Michael Croner) – A tall 11-year-old boy who is another one of Craig's close friends. He wears an oversized red hockey jersey. While not shown to be very bright, he is imaginative and kind to those around him. He is prone to getting very dirty and injuring himself. "J.P." is short for John Paul, as revealed in "You're It". In "Under the Overpass", Craig stated that he and Kelsey "found" J.P. in a previous adventure.

Craig's family
 Jessica Williams (voiced by Dharma Brown (pilot) and Lucia Cunningham (series)) – Craig's 6-year-old younger sister who typically likes to keep everything in check by describing her actions out loud. She is very smart for her age, detail-oriented, and already shows an interest in the stock market.
 Bernard Williams (voiced by Phil LaMarr) – Craig's smart, no-nonsense, and sometimes snobby, teenage older brother. He looks down on Craig and his misadventures at the creek. He is obsessed with getting good grades and getting into an Ivy League school. He values love and the importance of homework.
 Duane Williams (voiced by Terry Crews) — Craig's understanding father who works as a computer programmer. He sometimes plays retro video games with Craig. He loves dad jokes.
 Nicole Williams (voiced by Kimberly Hébert Gregory) – Craig's loving mother who works as a school counselor and cares deeply for her children. She is a graduate of Howard University.
Earl Williams (voiced by LaMarr (pilot) and Phil Morris (series)) – Craig's grandfather and Duane's father. Craig looks up to him and has inherited his adventurous spirit.
 Jojo Williams (voiced by Saundra McClain) – Craig's grandmother and Duane's mother who is a city councilwoman and was a civil rights activist back in the 1960s.

Music 
The show's music is composed by Jeff Rosenstock, who specializes in the ska genre. Ben Levin and Matt Burnett are both fans of ska, which is why they wanted Rosenstock for the job.

Episodes

Production

Development
The greenlit announcement publicly made on March 30, 2017 alongside other shows such as Apple & Onion and Summer Camp Island. Matt Burnett also stated on his Twitter account that he and his team had recently begun production around that time.

In August 2021, Trammell told Insider that the show's writing room is full of more than 40 people "all with different backgrounds and different experiences, who are willing to share those experiences." He also said the show is different from shows where there is only one person of color in the writing room, stating that since their writing room is open "it never feels like you're the one representative."

LGBT representation

In April 2018, two lesbian characters were confirmed. In their debut episode, "The Curse", Tabitha refuses to go college and wants to spend time with Courtney. Courtney blushes, and they are holding hands in the end. In "The Haunted Dollhouse", they have feelings for each other, which is confirmed, and they kiss.

In December 2019, it was confirmed that the show had a non-binary character, named Angel José. Their voice actor, Angel Lorenzana, who also uses they/them pronouns, an agender storyboard artist for the show, confirmed this. In later tweets, they added that their "cartoon self" used they/them before themselves, gave a shout out to the show's crew, and said that while this is a small contribution to LGBTQ+ representation, they hope "fans can take comfort knowing that there's also non-binary people working behind the scenes" on every of the show's episodes. Some praised the show for the number of non-binary characters, comparing it to the apparent number of “non-binary characters” in Steven Universe, where every Gem is “non-binary” (Though the Gems are biologically genderless and all use female pronouns) 

Other LGBTQ characters appear in the show like J.P.'s openly lesbian older sister, Laura. In the episode "Jextra Perrestrial", She is shown to be in a same-sex relationship with a girl named Kat. Laura is voiced by openly lesbian comedian Fortune Feimster. Raj and Shawn, Honeysuckle Rangers from a neighborhood nearby, are implied to have feelings for each other in several episodes. Raj is voiced by openly gay actor Parvesh Cheena. Also, the episode "Cousin of the Creek", Jasmine tells her cousin "I'm texting my girlfriend, mind your business."

The season 4 episode "Fire & Ice" focuses on Kelsey and Stacks' relationship as they confessed their love to each other. At the end of another season 4 episode, "Silver Fist Returns", Cat Burglar (Secret Keeper) is revealed to be gay and has a crush on George of The Tea Timers. George blushes and asks him out and he accepts, making them officially a couple. Secret Keeper is voiced by non-binary actor Cole Escola.

Broadcast

On July 15, 2019, it was announced that the series was renewed for a third season which premiered on June 21, 2020. It was later renewed for a fourth season on February 17, 2021, which premiered on October 25, 2021, and a fifth season on January 19, 2022, which is expected to premiere in early 2023. In October 2022, it was announced that the fifth season will be cut in half by Warner Bros. Discovery.

On May 2, 2022, the show also began airing reruns on Cartoon Network's sister channel, Boomerang.

The show left Boomerang on October 28, 2022, along with Teen Titans Go!, The Amazing World of Gumball, and Total Dramarama, as those shows still air on Cartoon Network.

International broadcast
The series made its international debut on Teletoon in Canada on May 3, 2018. In most countries in Europe and Latin America, it airs on Cartoon Network.

Home media

Reception

The series was received positively. Emily Ashby of Common Sense Media described the series as "appealing" with its "affirming messages." She also argued that the series had recurring themes of "creativity, joy, adventure, individuality, and self-discovery".

Awards and nominations

Other media

Spin-off 
On February 17, 2021, it was announced that a preschool spin-off series centered on Craig's little sister Jessica was in development. Titled Jessica's Big Little World, the new series is set to air as part of Cartoon Network's Cartoonito preschool block. On January 19, 2022, it was announced that the series would premiere in 2023.

In October 2022, it was announced that the first season of the spin-off will be cut in half by Warner Bros. Discovery.

Film 
An origin film, Craig of the Creek: The Movie, was announced on January 19, 2022 and set to release in 2023.

Series ending
In December 2022, it was announced the series finished production and seven episodes were cut from the fifth season.

References

External links

 
https://thetvdb.com/?tab=series&id=338736
TheTVDB.com
https://thetvdb.com/series/craig-of-the-creek
Cartoon Network 
https://www.cartoonnetwork.com/video/craig-of-the-creek/index.html

2018 American television series debuts
2010s American LGBT-related animated television series
2020s American LGBT-related animated television series
2010s American LGBT-related comedy television series
2020s American LGBT-related comedy television series
2010s American animated television series
2020s American animated television series
2010s American black cartoons
2020s American black cartoons
American children's animated adventure television series
American children's animated comedy television series
Animated television series about children
Cartoon Network original programming
Television series by Cartoon Network Studios
English-language television shows
Television shows set in Maryland
Disability in television